The 1985 Sunkist Women's Tennis Association (WTA) Championships was a women's tennis tournament played on outdoor clay courts at the Amelia Island Plantation on Amelia Island, Florida, United States. The tournament was part of the Category 4 tier of the 1985 WTA Tour. It was the sixth edition of the tournament and was held from April 15 through April 21, 1985. Zina Garrison won the singles title and earned $32,000 first-prize money.

Finals

Singles
 Zina Garrison defeated  Chris Evert-Lloyd 6–4, 6–3
 It was Garrison's 1st singles title of the year and the 2nd of her career.

Doubles
 Rosalyn Fairbank /  Hana Mandlíková defeated  Carling Bassett /  Chris Evert-Lloyd 6–1, 2–6, 6–2
 It was Fairbank's 2nd doubles title of the year and the 11th of her career. It was Mandlíková's 2nd doubles title of the year and the 9th of her career.

References

External links
 ITF tournament edition details

Sunkist WTA Championships
Amelia Island Championships
Sunkist WTA Championships
Sunkist WTA Championships
Sunkist WTA Championships